To recognise excellence in professional dance in the United Kingdom, The Critics' Circle organised and presented the National Dance Awards 2006.  The ceremony was held at the Sadler's Wells Theatre, London, on 25 January 2007, with awards given for productions staged in the previous year.

Awards presented 
 De Valois Award for Outstanding Achievement in Dance - Ivor Guest, dance historian and writer 
 Best Male Dancer - Carlos Acosta, for performances with his own company and The Royal Ballet
 Best Female Dancer - Miyako Yoshida, for performances as a Principal of The Royal Ballet 
 Working Title Billy Elliot Prize - Brad Corben and Joseph Poulton
 Audience Award - Northern Ballet Theatre and Independent Ballet Wales
 Dance UK Industry Award - Val Bourne CBE
 Best Choreography (Classical) - Alexei Ratmansky, for The Bright Stream
 Best Choreography (Modern) - Wayne McGregor, for Amu
 Best Choreography (Musical Theatre) - Twyla Tharp
 Emerging Male or Female Artist (Classical) - Steven McRae, for performances with The Royal Ballet
 Emerging Male or Female Artist (Modern) - Alexander Varona, freelance dancer
 Company Prize for Outstanding Repertoire (Classical) - Les Ballets Trockadero de Monte Carlo
 Company Prize for Outstanding Repertoire (Modern) - Phoenix Dance Theatre
 Best Foreign Dance Company - The Bolshoi Ballet, for performances at the Royal Opera House
 Patons Award - Strictly Come Dancing

Special awards 
No special awards were presented for the 2006 season.

References 

National Dance Awards
Dance
Dance